Anton Brioschi (30 November 1855, Vienna - 31 August 1920, Vienna) was an Austrian painter, scenic designer and graphic artist. His non-theatrical works were mostly landscapes and marine art.

Life and work 
His father, Carlo Brioschi, was also a painter and set designer. His older brother, Othmar Brioschi, also became an artist; specializing in landscapes. In 1882, he was briefly employed by the city theater in Teplitz, followed by six months in Munich, working with the stage designer, Simon Quaglio. In 1883, he was hired as a theatre painter at the Staatsoper Hannover, and received good critical reviews in the local media.

After 1884, he worked at his father's studios and at the Vienna State Opera. In 1886, he succeeded him as Director of the Opera's art studios; a position he held until his death. His first project in that position involved creating new curtains (destroyed during World War II). 

Until the late 1890s, He personally designed the sets for the Opera's most important productions, including Otello (1888), Cavalleria Rusticana (1891), Pagliacci (1893), and The Bartered Bride (1896). His sets were critically praised for their educational value, and audiences loved the bright colors.

In 1897, Gustav Mahler was appointed as Conductor and General Director. Three years later, Heinrich Lefler became his assistant, in charge of the furnishing and props department. Taken together, these additions had a tendency to restrict his independence and, increasingly, he found himself simply creating other people's designs. The final blow came in 1903, when the set decorating was assigned to Alfred Roller. After that, Brioschi was little more than a supervisor for the stage workers. 

This brought an end to a period when the Brioschi family set the styles and standards for Central European theatre. Many of his independent watercolors and oil paintings are in public museums and privately owned.

Sources 
 
 Heinrich Fuchs: Die österreichischen Maler des 19. Jahrhunderts. Vol.1, K 46, Vienna 1972.
 Heinrich Fuchs: Die österreichischen Maler des 19. Jahrhunderts. Supplementary volume, K 70, Vienna 1978.

External links 

More works by Brioschi @ ArtNet

1855 births
1920 deaths
Austrian artists
Austrian scenic designers
Austrian landscape painters
Artists from Vienna